Adrián "Adri" Gómez Ramírez (born 17 January 1994) is a Spanish footballer who plays for Valencia CF Mestalla. A versatile player, he can either play as a central defender or as a defensive midfielder.

Club career
Born in Cuenca, Castilla-La Mancha, Adri finished his formation with Valencia CF, making his senior debuts with the reserves in the 2012–13 campaign, in Segunda División B. On 2 September 2013 he moved to La Roda CF, also in the third division.

On 27 August 2014 Adri joined another reserve team, Albacete Balompié B in Tercera División. He made his first team debut on 6 September of the following year, starting in a 1–3 away loss against Real Oviedo in the Segunda División championship.

Adri scored his first professional goal on 10 January 2016, scoring the game's only in an away victory against Bilbao Athletic. He suffered relegation in the end of the season, being a regular starter from January.

On 10 November 2016 Adri renewed his contract until 2020, and was mainly used as a backup to Mickaël Gaffoor and Carlos Delgado as his side returned to the second level at first attempt.

On 24 January 2018, after being rarely used, Adri was loaned to Kazakhstani club FC Irtysh Pavlodar. Upon returning, he terminated his contract with Alba on 31 January 2019.

Adri joined Polish I liga club Podbeskidzie Bielsko-Biała on 8 February 2019 on a contract for the rest of the season.

References

External links

1994 births
Living people
People from Cuenca, Spain
Sportspeople from the Province of Cuenca
Spanish footballers
Spanish expatriate footballers
Footballers from Castilla–La Mancha
Association football defenders
Association football midfielders
Association football utility players
Segunda División players
Segunda División B players
Tercera División players
Tercera Federación players
Kazakhstan Premier League players
I liga players
Valencia CF Mestalla footballers
Atlético Albacete players
Albacete Balompié players
FC Irtysh Pavlodar players
La Roda CF players
Podbeskidzie Bielsko-Biała players
Expatriate footballers in Kazakhstan
Expatriate footballers in Poland
Spanish expatriate sportspeople in Kazakhstan
Spanish expatriate sportspeople in Poland